Aldo Giuffrè (10 April 1924 – 26 June 2010) was an Italian film actor and comedian who appeared in over 90 films between 1948 and 2001. He was born in Naples and was the brother of actor Carlo Giuffrè.

He is known for his roles in The Four Days of Naples, and as the alcoholic Captain Clinton of the Union Army in the Sergio Leone film The Good, the Bad and the Ugly in 1966.

Giuffrè died in Rome in 2010 of peritonitis. He is interred at Cimitero Flaminio in Rome.

Selected filmography

 Assunta Spina (1948) – Don Marcusio, la guardia
 The Emperor of Capri (1949) – Omar Bey Kahn di Agapur
 Napoli milionaria (1950) – Federico
 The Cadets of Gascony (1950) – Un caporale
 Totò Tarzan (1950) – Un paracadutista
 Vita da cani (1950) – Il barista (uncredited)
 Totò sceicco (1950) – Altro legionario
 Totò terzo uomo (1951) – L'avvocato del sindaco
 Filumena Marturano (1951) – Luigi
 The Steamship Owner (1951) – Nicola
 Guardie e ladri (1951) – Amilcare
 The Machine to Kill Bad People (1952)
 Cinque poveri in automobile (1952) – Padella
 La figlia del diavolo (1952) – Carceriere
 Un turco napoletano (1953) – Faina
 Captain Phantom (1953)
 I Always Loved You (1953) – Felice
 Villa Borghese (1953) – Il vigile Attilio Scardaci (segment: Incidente a Villa Borghese)
 Carosello napoletano (1954)
 The Doctor of the Mad (1954) – Ciccillo
 Le signorine dello 04 (1955) – Guido Colasanti
 Toto in Hell (1955) – Minosse
 Racconti romani (1955) – The Flirting Lawyer at the Park (uncredited)
 I giorni più belli (1955)
 Peccato di castità (1956)
 Malafemmena (1957) – Carmine Cammarano
 Rascel marine (1958) – Marine
 Lui, lei e il nonno (1959) – Mimmo
 I magliari (1959) – Armando
 Juke box urli d'amore (1959) – Bruno
 I piaceri del sabato notte (1960) – Ernesto
 Il carabiniere a cavallo (1961) – Il tenente istruttore
 Il re di Poggioreale (1961) – Il brigadiere Crisquolo
 The Best of Enemies (1961) – Sgt. Todini
 Accroche-toi, y'a du vent! (1961) – Manone
 I due della legione (1962) – Sadrim
 The Four Days of Naples (1962) – Pitrella (uncredited)
 The Shortest Day (1963) – Uno degli eredi siciliani (uncredited)
 Hercules, Samson and Ulysses (1963) – Saran of Gaza
 Ieri, oggi, domani (1963) – Pasquale Nardella (segment "Adelina")
 I Cuori infranti (1963) – Carlo De Tomasi (segment "La manina di Fatma")
 Totò contro il pirata nero (1964) – Tenente Burrasca
 I marziani hanno 12 mani (1964) – Il protettore di prostitute
 Due mafiosi nel Far West (1964) – Avvocato difesa
 Love and Marriage (1964) – (segment "Ultima carta, L'")
 La maschera e il volto (1965, TV) – Paolo Grazia
 Letti sbagliati (1965) – Carlo De Rossi (segment "Il complicato")
 Gli amanti latini (1965) – Arminio (segment "Il telefono consolatore")
 Made in Italy (1965) – Vincenzino (segment "1 'Usi e costumi', episode 2")
 Spiaggia libera (1966) – Cuccurallo – il carabiniere
 Les Combinards (1966) – Vincenzo del Giudice – un giornalista
 The Good, the Bad and the Ugly (1966) – Alcoholic Union Captain
 No Diamonds for Ursula (1967) – Marcos
 Questi fantasmi (1967) – Raffaele
 The Most Beautiful Couple in the World (1968) – Turiddu
 Certo, certissimo, anzi... probabile (1969) – Vedovo del Barbiere
 Scacco alla regina (1969) – Spartaco
 Con quale amore, con quanto amore (1970) – Giovanni
 Cerca di capirmi (1970)
 Quando le donne avevano la coda (1970) – Zog
 When Men Carried Clubs and Women Played Ding-Dong (1971) – Gott
 No desearás la mujer del vecino (1971) – Mariano
 Hector the Mighty (1972) – Agamenonne
 La violenza: Quinto potere (1972) – Giuseppe Salemi
 Gli eroi (1973) – Spartaco Amore
 My Pleasure Is Your Pleasure (1973) – Grand Duke
 Il brigadiere Pasquale Zagaria ama la mamma e la polizia (1973) – Zoppas
 Furto di sera bel colpo si spera (1973)
 Pasqualino Cammarata, Frigate Captain (1974) – Pasqualino Cammarata
 Il testimone deve tacere (1974) – Il commissario Santi
 Sesso in testa (1974) – Frank Innamorato
 Prostituzione (1974) – Inspector Macaluso
 Colpo in canna (1975) – Don Calò
 Gente di rispetto (1975) – Maresciallo
 Chi dice donna dice donna (1976) – Il commissario (segment "La signorina X")
 L'adolescente (1976) – Maresciallo dei carabinieri
 La prima notte di nozze (1976)
 Oh Serafina (1976) – Professor Osvaldo Caroniti
 Tre sotto il lenzuolo (1979) – Il cardinale (segment "L'omaggio")
 Ciao marziano (1980) – Dott. Ponzio
 Zappatore (1980) – Maresciallo Barbato
 Per favore, occupati di Amelia (1981) – Il prete
 Carcerato (1981) – Don Peppino Ascalone
 Mi manda Picone (1984) – Cocò
 L'ultima scena (1988) – Peppino Patito
 Mortacci (1989) – Impresario pompe funebri
 Scugnizzi (1989) – Don Nicola
 La repubblica di San Gennaro (2003) – Il professore

References

External links

 

1924 births
2010 deaths
Burials at the Cimitero Flaminio
Deaths from peritonitis
Italian male film actors
Male Spaghetti Western actors
Male Western (genre) film actors
Male actors from Naples